Ngesti Pandawa is a professional wayang wong, or wayang orang, art company located in Semarang. The Ngesti Pandawa wayang orang is housed in the Ki Narto Sabdho Hall, in Taman Budaya Raden Saleh. It is also located in the Taman Raden Saleh Cultural Complex, at Jalan Sriwijaya 29, Semarang City, Central Java Province, Indonesia. Ngesti Pandawa is one of three surviving wayang orang troupes in Indonesia, besides Wayang Orang Sriwedari, in Taman Sriwedari Solo, and Wayang Orang Bharata, in Jakarta. It is hoped that wayang orang will again be able to entertain generations of audiences, while sending a timeless, moral message.

History 
Ngesti Pandawa was founded in Madiun by Sastro Sabdo on July 1, 1937, with the aim of reviving the art of wayang orang panggung, wayang plays performed by human actors on a proscenium stage. Wayang orang panggung is a blend of court wayang orang (which was also called pendhapa wayang orang because it was performed in the pendhapa [the spacious open hall of Javanese stately mansions] instead on a stage) with western theater. The first wayang orang panggung troupe was first established in 1895 by Gan Kan, a Chinese entrepreneur from Surakarta (Solo).a The founding of wayang orang Ngesti Pandawa was intended to preserve the art of wayang orang, and inspire a sense of love in traditional arts. The wayang orang performances also provide entertainment to the public. Sastro Sabdo's mission was supported by Sastro Sudirdjo, Narto Sabdo, Darso Sabdo, and Kusni.

Since its founding, wayang orang Ngesti Pandawa has been much liked by the public. Not only by the Javanese but also by the Dutch and Chinese population. Wayang orang, from its early beginning, was a performing art that was enjoyed by a diverse audience, indigenous and non-indigenous.

Ngesti Pandawa has gone through a long historical journey in the city of Semarang. During that time, Ngesti Pandawa has had to move several times. In 1954, Ngesti Pandawa occupied a new building in the Gedung Rakyat Indonesia Semarang (GRIS) building complex at Jalan Pemuda 116 (currently Paragon City Mall Semarang). From the 1960s to the 1970s, under the leadership of Sastro Sabdo and Narto Sabdo Ngesti Pandawa reached its peak of popularity and became an icon of Semarang. Ngesti Pandawa became a point of reference for other wayang orang groups in that era. Its theatrical scenery, musical accompaniment, costume, choreography, and stage tricks were emulated by other wayang orang groups.

The popularity of Ngesti Pandawa attracted the attention of President Sukarno. When Mount Merapi erupted 1953, Ngesti Pandawa was called to raise funds for the victims. President Sukarno invited Ngesti Pandawa to perform at the Istana Merdeka or Merdeka Palace in Jakarta and Istana Negara or the Palace in Bogor. This was certainly a proud moment for Ngesti Pandawa.  For a wayang orang company, being invited to perform at the State Palace is certainly a great honour. Due to its achievements, Ngesti Pandawa in 1962 was again invited to the Presidential Palace to receive the Wijayakusuma Award from the President of the Republic of Indonesia.

In 1994, the GRIS complex was sold by the local government to a third party. Ngesti Pandawa had no home anymore, and had to move to the Taman Raden Saleh Cultural Complex and was housed in a theater building for two years. In 1996 it moved to the Majapahit Amusement Park and formed the Wayang Orang Ngesti Pandawa Foundation. In 2001 Ngesti Pandawa was again given the opportunity by the local government to use a hall at the Taman Raden Saleh cultural complex. Ngesti Pandawa reserves the right to use the hall every three days in a week. However, regular performances are only staged on Saturday evenings starting at 8 pm.

Current situation
Despite the ups and downs, the Wayang Orang Ngesti Pandawa continues to perform, keeping its mission to preserve Javanese culture and to entertain the people of Semarang and tourists visiting the city. Every Saturday at 8 pm Ngesti Pandawa is never fails to perform, presenting  different lakons or stories from the vast wayang repertoire.

Several social media such as his website, Facebook, Instagram, and YouTube are used to get interest from the society and tourists.

In addition to regular performances at the Raden Saleh Cultural Park in Semarang, Ngesti Pandawa has also performed in other cities including Sukoharjo, Jepara, Solo, and Jakarta. Ngesti Pandawa even has performed for limited audiences such as students and government as well private institutions, as part of its effort to introduce wayang orang to the general public.

The head of Semarang City's Culture and Tourism Office, Masdiana Safitri, has promised to renovate the venue of Ngesti Pandawa, to make it more attractive and comfortable for visitors. Hopefully, this will allow Ngesti Pandawa to regain its former glory, as an entertainment with a timeless moral message to all generations of people.

Notes 
a.  Rustopo, 2007
b.  Mumpuni, 1986
c.  Rinardi, 2002
d.  Moehadi, 1987

External links 
 Perkumpulan Wayang Orang Ngesti Pandowo (1937-2001): Studi Tentang Manajemen Seni Pertunjukan
 Wayang Orang Ngesti Pandowo 2001-2015: Kajian tentang Manajemen Senin Pertunjukan
 Pola Pewarisan Pemain Wanita Wayang Orang Ngesti Pandawa Semarang

Dance in Indonesia
Wayang